The 1993 Italian motorcycle Grand Prix was the twelfth race of the 1993 Grand Prix motorcycle racing season. It took place on 5 September 1993 at the Circuito Internazionale Santa Monica.

500 cc race report
Luca Cadalora received his first pole of the season at his home race, sending the Italian press into a frenzy.  He would go on to receive seven more poles in his 500 career.  Cadalora got lead at the start from Wayne Rainey and John Kocinski.  Kevin Schwantz passed Kocinski and closed in 3rd.  Rainey rode aggressively and qualified .021 seconds behind Cadalora.

Rainey, in the lead, went through the fast right-hander and got on the gas too early.  The back end of his bike went out of control, causing him to lowside.  As he slid off the track, the deep furrows in the gravel somersaulted him end-over-end and he landed heavily on his head.  He was helicoptered away from circuit with a broken spine.

Mick Doohan got past Schwantz hoping to catch Cadalora, but was unable to pass him. The Italian fans swarmed the track when Cadalora won.

This was the last race of the former champion Freddie Spencer.

After the race
Tad Pilati of the Roberts team said of Rainey:  Rainey ended up paralysed from the chest down and would never walk again. However, he stayed in motorcycle racing in management roles and has raced in a hand-control shifter kart, often with his motorcycle racing rival Eddie Lawson.  Rainey has raced in the shifter kart exhibition race held at Red Bull United States Grand Prix, which features motorcycle racing legends.

Grand Prix motorcycle racing did not return to Circuito Internazionale Santa Monica until 2007. By then, the circuit had been modified and rerouted clockwise.

500 cc classification

250 cc classification

References

Italian motorcycle Grand Prix
Italian
Motorcycle Grand Prix